Twanisha "TeeTee" Terry (born January 24, 1999) is an American sprinter specializing in the 100 meters distance. She represented the United States at the 2018 IAAF World U20 Championships, earning a silver medal in the women's 100 m. In 2019 she won the 60 m at the NCAA Division I Indoor Championships and anchored the winning  relay team at the NCAA Division I Outdoor Championships.

As a 19-year old Terry ran 100 m in 10.99 s at the Mt. SAC Relays on April 21, 2018. This time made her the joint fourth fastest under-20 woman in history. Her personal best is 10.87 s, set at the 2021 NCAA Division I West Preliminary in College Station, Texas on 29 May 2021.

Achievements
Information from World Athletics profile unless otherwise noted.

Personal bests

International championship results

National championship results

NCAA results from Track & Field Results Reporting System.

References

External links

Videos
Women's 60m dash - 2019 NCAA Indoor Track and Field Championship via the NCAA on YouTube

1999 births
Living people
American female sprinters
African-American female track and field athletes
Track and field athletes from Miami
USC Trojans women's track and field athletes
Pan American Games medalists in athletics (track and field)
Pan American Games bronze medalists for the United States
Athletes (track and field) at the 2019 Pan American Games
Medalists at the 2019 Pan American Games
21st-century African-American sportspeople
21st-century African-American women